Framed is an American television program that airs on the IFC network. The show began in December 2007 and features athletes being interviewed by music and film stars. Shoemaker Reebok is producing the series in a partnership with the IFC network and all the athletes featured have endorsed Reebok products. Other partners involved in the series are Carat Entertainment and Roadside Entertainment.

References

2000s American television talk shows
2010s American television talk shows
2007 American television series debuts
IFC (American TV channel) original programming